Hydrogenaudio is an online community of audio enthusiasts, including some software developers. It is known for its blind listening tests and scientific mindset. It has a website with forums featuring discussions about all kinds of audio reproduction issues. There is also a wiki with articles about codecs and other aspects of audio technology. The website was launched in 2001 and reported 112,875 registered user accounts in April 2019.

See also 
 Codec listening test

References

External links 
 

Music Internet forums
Technology websites